Harry Haskell Lew (January 4, 1884 – October 1963) was an American basketball player, who is known as the first black Professional basketball player.

Biography 
Harry "Bucky" Lew was born in Pawtucketville section of Dracut, Massachusetts (now Pawtucketville section Lowell, Massachusetts annexed in 1874  the son of William and Isabell (Brown) Lew.  Like generations of Lews, Bucky Lew was a talented musician and played a violin solo at his graduation from Pawtucketville Grammar School.  In the late 1890s, he entered his father's dry cleaning business in downtown Lowell.   He had three daughters: Eleanor, Phyllis, and Frances.

Family history
A member of an African-American family with a long history in Massachusetts, his great-great-grandfather, Barzillai Lew, was a freeman who served in the American Revolution.  Barzillai was a fifer and served with Captain John Ford at the Battle of Bunker Hill on June 17, 1775.  Barzillai was imortalized in the Duke Ellington song "Barzillai Lou".  His great-great-aunt Lucy Lew and her husband Thomas Dalton were civil rights activists.  The home of his grandparents, Adrastus and Elizabeth Lew, was a station on the Underground Railroad.  His father, William Lew, was a delegate to the 1891 Equal Rights Convention in Boston, Massachusetts.

Basketball career 

In 1898, he joined the YMCA "young employed boys" basketball team.  His team was state champion for the four years he played with them.  In 1902, at the age of 18, he was recruited to join Lowell's Pawtucketville Athletic Club "P.A.C." of the New England Professional Basketball League.  His teammates considered him one of the best double dribblers in the league, which was still legal.  The team manager hesitated to put Lew in the game, but the local press put pressure on the team to play Lew.  He got his first chance after a series of injuries to other players resulted in being allowed on court.

January 4, 1922 Lowell Sun covered the Lowell Textile Institute UMass Lowell River Hawks, Basketball Team season and the newly appointed coach Harry "Bucky" Lew.

Years later "Bucky" Lew was interviewed by Gerry Finn for the Springfield, Massachusetts Union on April 2, 1958 about that first game.  "I can almost see the faces of those Marlborough players when I got into that game," said Lew, who was seventy-four when the article was published. "Our Lowell team had been getting players from New York, New Jersey, Pennsylvania, and some of the local papers put the pressure on by demanding that they give this little Negro from around the corner a chance to play. Well, at first the team just ignored the publicity. But a series of injuries forced the manager to take me on for the Marlborough game. I made the sixth player that night and he said all I had to do was sit on the bench for my five bucks pay. There was no such thing as fouling out in those days so he figured he'd be safe all around.

"It just so happens that one of the Lowell players got himself injured and had to leave the game. At first this manager refused to put me in. He let them play us five on four but the fans got real mad and almost started a riot, screaming to let me play. That did it. I went in there and you know . . . all those things you read about Jackie Robinson, the abuse, the name-calling, extra effort to put him down . . . they're all true. I got the same treatment and even worse. Basketball was a rough game then. I took the bumps, the elbows in the gut, knees here and everything else that went with it. But I gave it right back. It was rough but worth it. Once they knew I could take it, I had it made. Some of those same boys who gave the hardest licks turned out to be among my best friends in the years that followed."

"The finest players in the country were in that league just before it disbanded and I always wound up playing our opponent's best shooter," Lew said. "I like to throw from outside but wasn't much around the basket."

"Of course, we had no backboards in those days and everything had to go in clean. Naturally, there was no rebounding and after a shot there was a brawl to get the ball. There were no out-of-bounds markers. We had a fence around the court with nets hanging from the ceilings. The ball was always in play and you were guarded from the moment you touched it. Hardly had time to breathe, let alone think about what you were going to do with the ball."

The New England League changed its name to the New England Association and disbanded after the 1905 season. For the next twenty years, Lew barnstormed around New England with teams he organized, and in 1926 when he played his final game in St. John's, Vermont, he was forty-two years old. That was 24 years before the Boston Celtics drafted Charles Chuck Cooper, the first African American for the NBA.  In 1928, he moved and relocated his dry cleaning business to Springfield, Massachusetts, where he lived until he died in 1963.

"Bucky" Lew was a man of courage and perseverance. "He didn't talk much about basketball," his daughter told a reporter, "but sometimes, if things weren't going so well for one of us, or if we were having difficult times, he'd talk about how things were for him back then. He used his athletic experience to teach us what life was about."

Lew has never been inducted into the Basketball Hall of Fame. His daughter, Phyllis Lew, had been trying to get her father included since the 1970s. Since 2016, Bucky Lew has been on the Basketball Hall of Fame, DIRECT-ELECT CATEGORY: Early African-American Pioneers Committee Nominations.

See also

Lowell High School (Lowell, Massachusetts) Teresa and Gerard Lew (sister and brother)
List of museums focused on African Americans Gerard Lew (brother)

References

Ashe, Arthur. Hard Road to Glory: History of African American Athletes. Amistad Press, 1993.

External links
Mass Moments: Harry "Bucky" Lew sponsored by Mass Humanities 
"Profiles in Courage: African Americans in Lowell" by Mayo, Martha. University of Massachusetts Lowell, Center for Lowell History

1884 births
1963 deaths
African-American basketball players
American men's basketball players
Basketball players from Massachusetts
People from Dracut, Massachusetts
Sportspeople from Middlesex County, Massachusetts
Sportspeople from Lowell, Massachusetts
20th-century African-American people